Child Focus (or the European Center for Missing and Sexually Exploited Children) is a Belgian foundation that supports prevention and investigation of missing children, abducted children, runaway children, and sexually abused and exploited children, along with  psychological and legal support to the victims. They also follow their cases and sometimes ensure they are treated with due care by the persons in charge. Finally, they help and spread the information about missing children by publishing their pictures and descriptions in newspapers, magazines, etc.

Since 1998, Child Focus has treated 3,000 cases a year, and closed 70% of them within the year.

History 
Child Focus was created on Jean-Denis Lejeune's initiative in June 1996, one year after the abduction of his daughter Julie and her friend Melissa by Marc Dutroux.

Lejeune had learned about the existence of the National Center for Missing and Exploited Children in Washington, D.C. and went to visit it in order to study its structure. During the White March in Brussels on October 20, 1996, he asked Prime Minister Jean-Luc Dehaene for help in creating a similar organization in Belgium.  Its honorary president is her Majesty Queen Paola.

On March 31, 1998, Child Focus was fully operational, and in July 1997, Daniel Cardon de Lichtbuer became the first Chairman of the organization.

See also 
 Michel Fourniret
 Claude Lelièvre

External links 
 Child Focus – Website of the European Commission

Child abduction in Belgium
Child sexual abuse
Missing people organizations
Organizations that combat human trafficking
Sexual abuse advocacy and support groups
Organizations established in 1998
Person databases
Organisations based in Belgium
Marc Dutroux